A total of over 2,700 goals have been scored in games at the 22 final tournaments of the FIFA World Cup, not counting penalties scored during shoot-outs. Since the first goal scored by French player Lucien Laurent at the 1930 FIFA World Cup, almost 1,300  footballers have scored goals at the World Cup tournaments, of whom 101 have scored five or more.

The top goalscorer of the inaugural competition was Argentina's Guillermo Stábile with eight goals. Since then, only 25 players have scored more at all the games played at the World Cup than Stábile did throughout the 1930 tournament. The first was Hungary's Sándor Kocsis with eleven in 1954. At the next tournament, France's Just Fontaine improved on this record with 13 goals in only six games. Gerd Müller scored 10 for West Germany in 1970 and broke the overall record when he scored his 14th goal in a tournament match at a World Cup during West Germany's win in the 1974 final. His record stood for more than three decades until Ronaldo's 15 goals between 1998 and 2006 for Brazil. Germany's Miroslav Klose went on to score a record 16 goals across four consecutive tournaments between 2002 and 2014.

Of all the players who have played in the World Cup tournaments, only six have achieved an average of two goals or more per game played: Kocsis, Fontaine, Stábile, Russia's Oleg Salenko, Switzerland's Josef Hügi, and Poland's Ernst Wilimowski — the last of these scored four in his single World Cup game in 1938. The top 101 goalscorers have represented 30 nations, with 14 players scoring for Brazil, and another 14 for Germany or West Germany. In total, 67 footballers came from UEFA (Europe), 30 from CONMEBOL (South America), and only four from elsewhere: Cameroon, Ghana, Australia, and the United States.

Fontaine holds the record for the most goals scored in a single tournament, with 13 goals in 1958. The players that came closest were Kocsis in 1954, Müller in 1970 and Portugal's Eusébio in 1966, with 11, 10 and 9, respectively. The lowest scoring top scorer was in 1962, when six players tied at only four goals each. Across the 22 tournaments of the World Cup, 31 footballers have been credited with the most tournament goals, and no one has achieved this feat twice. Ten of them scored at least seven goals in a tournament, while Brazil's Jairzinho and Argentine's Lionel Messi were the only footballers to score at least seven goals without being the top goalscorer of the tournament in 1970 and 2022, respectively. These 31 top goalscorers played for 20 nations, the most (five) for Brazil. Another five came from other South American countries, with the remaining 21 coming from Europe.

In 2006, Ronaldo was the first to score 8 goals in knockout matches (excluding 3rd place playoff) at the World Cup in his 3 tournaments for Brazil, tied in 2022 by Kylian Mbappé. Mbappé became the first player to score 4 goals in World Cup finals with his hat-trick in 2022.

Overall top goalscorers

Timeline

Top goalscorers for each tournament

Goalscorers at multiple tournaments

Top goalscorers in final matches

Bold indicates winning final
Parentheses indicates no goals scored

See also
List of FIFA World Cup hat-tricks
List of FIFA World Cup own goals
All-time table of the FIFA World Cup

Notes

References

External links
FIFA World Cup statistics at FIFA.com
Statistics at RSSSF
Planet World Cup

Goalscorers
FIFA World Cup records and statistics
World Cup top scorers